A prayer book is a book containing prayers and perhaps devotional readings, for private or communal use, or in some cases, outlining the liturgy of religious services. Books containing mainly orders of religious services, or readings for them are termed "service books" or "liturgical books", and are thus not prayer-books in the strictest sense, but the term is often used very loosely. A religion's scriptures might also be considered prayer books as well.

Jewish prayer books 
In Judaism, the Siddur is a prayer book "containing the three daily prayers; also the prayers for Shabbat, Rosh-Chodesh and the festivals."

Christian prayer books

Breviaries 

Daily devotional 
Throughout the year, and especially during certain seasons of the Christian liturgical kalendar such as Advent and Lent, many Christians pray a daily devotional, which contains a prayer for each day along with a reflection on a passage from the Christian Bible.

Notable prayer books 
The following are among the many books to which the term may loosely refer in various churches, although in strict usage a prayer book is likely to mean a miscellaneous book of prayers as opposed to the standard service books as listed in the last group below:

 Actual prayer books

General
Daily Watchwords (Moravian Christian)
Raccolta (Catholic Christian)
Saint Augustine's Prayer Book (Anglican Christian)
Vatican Croatian Prayer Book (Catholic Christian)

Breviaries
Agpeya (Coptic Orthodox Christianity)
Anglican Breviary (Anglican Christianity)
For All the Saints (Lutheran Christianity)
Roman Breviary (Roman Catholic Christianity) 
Shehimo (Indian Orthodox Christianity)
Take Our Moments and Our Days: An Anabaptist Prayer Book (Mennonite Christianity)
The Brotherhood Prayer Book (Lutheran Christianity)
Book of Hours, a prayer book that contains the canonical hours in various branches of Christianity
Common Worship: Daily Prayer The first prayer book published since the Reformation by the Church of England containing the complete round of services of the Word for every day of the year: Morning Prayer, Prayer During the Day, Evening Prayer and Night Prayer, also called Compline.

 Service & liturgical books
Lutheran Service Book, in Lutheranism 
Book of Common Prayer (BCP), first published in 1549 for the Church of England and has considerable literary influence in the English language
Roman Missal in Roman Catholicism 
Agenda (liturgy), in Lutheranism
Common Worship, in Anglicanism
Alternative Service Book (adopted in 1980), in the Church of England
Directory of Public Worship, adopted in certain areas of the Church of England in the 17th century

See also 
 List of Christian devotional literature
 Libelli precum
 Missal

References